16 players played in the first edition of the Billie Jean King Invitational which would later become the LA Women's Tennis Championships. In the final it was top seed Billie Jean King who won 6–1, 6–2 against Rosie Casals who she played against in the previous week.

Draw

External links
 1971 Billie Jean King Inviational Draw

1971 Women's Tennis Circuit